"No Pretendo" ("I Don't Pretend To") is a 1997 song by American singer and songwriter Gloria Estefan. It was released as the sixth and final single from her seventh studio album, Destiny. This song is the Spanish-language version of the song "Steal Your Heart", from Destiny. It was released on international editions of the album, as well as a single in the United States and Spain, where the single peaked at number 28. The music video was recorded live from the Evolution World Tour in Mexico City at the Estadio Azteca. In 2004, "No pretendo" was made available on the compilations, Amor y Suerte: Éxitos Románticos, and Oye Mi Canto!: Los Grandes Exitos in 2006.

Charts

Weekly charts

See also
Number-one hits of 1997 (U.S. Hot Latin Tracks)
List of Billboard Latin Pop Airplay number ones of 1997

References

External links
Lyrics with English translation

1997 singles
Gloria Estefan songs
Spanish-language songs
Songs written by Kike Santander
1996 songs
Epic Records singles